Colony 28 is a science fiction-themed platform game developed for MS-DOS by Napoleon Games and published by JRC Interactive in 1997.

Plot
Earth was attacked by aliens in 2013 and conquered in few weeks. Humanity was enslaved, and Earth was given the name Colony 28. Humans are turned into obedient androids who work for the aliens. Five years later, the protagonist of the game, which is turned into a cyborg, preserves his memories due to a malfunction. He then turns against the aliens and helps the human resistance.

Gameplay
The game is a side-scrolling platform game. The player controls a combat robot and shoots enemies that try to destroy him. There are multiple tasks that player has to fulfill in every level. Once they complete the tasks, they move to the next level.

Development
The game was developed by team called 5th Dimension led by Martin Matějka. Matějka met Jindřich Rohlík during development, and 5th Dimension joined Rohlík's Napoleon Games. Napoleon Games finished the game in 1997. Colony 28 is inspired by games such as Another World and Flashback.

Reception
The game has received mostly positive reviews. Petr Bulíř of Level gave the game a score of 60%. He stated that the game is similar to Flashback. He noted game's high difficulty. Bulíř praised game's atmosphere and music, but was critical of its animations and graphics. He also praised the story, particularly its ending.

References 

1997 video games
Alien invasions in video games
DOS games
DOS-only games
JRC Interactive games
Platform games
Science fiction video games
Single-player video games
Video games about cyborgs
Video games developed in the Czech Republic
Video games set in 2013
Video games set in the 2010s
Napoleon Games games